Amel Bureković is a figure skater. He is the 2008 Bosnian national champion. 

He began competing in the 2007-2008 season.

External links
 
Srebreni u Ljubljani
Amel Burekovic odbranio naslov
Amel Burekovic
Burekovic najvise pokazao

1991 births
Living people
Bosnia and Herzegovina figure skaters